Nestor Paiva (June 30, 1905 – September 9, 1966) was an American actor of Portuguese descent. He is most famous for his recurring role of Teo Gonzales the innkeeper in Walt Disney's Spanish Western series Zorro and its feature film The Sign of Zorro, as well as Lucas the boat captain in Creature from the Black Lagoon and its sequel Revenge of the Creature.

Early years
Paiva attended the University of California. During his senior year, he directed a production, The Youngest, after the previous director resigned because of sickness.

Career
In the early 1930s, Paiva was director of the Eight o'Clock Players troupe at KLX radio in Oakland, California.  Paiva also appeared in network radio programs, including the 07/18/1953 episode of Gunsmoke entitled "Wild West".

Nestor appeared in motion pictures and television from the 1930s to the 1960s including such TV programs as The Lone Ranger , Zorro, Get Smart, Bonanza, I Spy, Family Affair, Gunsmoke, Perry Mason, The Andy Griffith Show, The Beverly Hillbillies, Daniel Boone, and The Addams Family. He appeared in more than 250 movies. Paiva married in 1941 and had two children, Joseph and Caetana, who appeared with him in the 1956 movie Comanche with Dana Andrews. As a voice actor, Paiva also contributed his voice to many characters on Hanna-Barbera's Jonny Quest (1964-1965).

Paiva died of cancer in 1966.

Selected filmography

 Dark Streets of Cairo (1940)
 Timber (1942)
 The Girl from Alaska (1942)
 Fly-by-Night (1942)
 Chetniks! The Fighting Guerrillas (1943)
 The Flying Jalopy (1943) as Ben Buzzard (voice, uncredited)
 Tarzan's Desert Mystery (1943)
 The Falcon in Mexico (1944)
 The Purple Heart (1944)
 Along the Navajo Trail (1945)
 Robin Hood of Monterey (1947)
 Mr. Reckless (1948)
 The Paleface (1948)
 Adventures of Casanova (1948)
 Joan of Arc (1948) as Henri le Royer, Catherine's husband
 Señor Droopy (1949) as Bullfight Announcer (voice, uncredited)
 Mighty Joe Young (1949)
 Young Man with a Horn (1950)
 Guilty of Treason (1950) as Mátyás Rákosi
 The Great Caruso (1951) as Egisto Barretto
 A Millionaire for Christy (1951)
 Flame of Stamboul (1951)
 The Lady Pays Off (1951)
 My Favorite Spy (1951)
 The Fabulous Senorita (1952)
 What's Sweepin''' (1953) as Wally Walrus / Strongman (voice, uncredited)
 The Bandits of Corsica (1953)
 Jivaro (1954) as Jacques
 Creature from the Black Lagoon (1954) as Lucas
 Casanova's Big Night (1954) as Gnocchi
 Alley to Bali (1954) as Volcano Idol Voice (voice, uncredited)
 The Desperado (1954) as Captain Jake Thornton
 Thunder Pass (1954) as Daniel Slaughter
 Four Guns to the Border (1954) as Greasy
 New York Confidential (1955) as Martinelli
 Revenge of the Creature (1955) as Lucas
 All That Heaven Allows (1955) as Manuel
 Tarantula (1955) as Sheriff Jack Andrews
 Hell on Frisco Bay (1956) as Louis Fiaschetti
 Comanche (1956) as Puffer
 The First Texan (1956) as Priest (uncredited)
 Scandal Incorporated (1956) as Leland Miller
 The Mole People (1956) as Prof. Etienne Lafarge
 The Wild Party (1956) as Branson
 Ride the High Iron (1956) as Yard Boss
 The Guns of Fort Petticoat (1957) as Tortilla
 Ten Thousand Bedrooms (1957) as Alfredo, the Jeweler (uncredited)
 Les Girls (1957) as Spanish Peasant (uncredited)
 Outcasts of the City (1958) as Pastor Skira
 The Deep Six (1958) as Pappa Tatos
 The Lady Takes a Flyer (1958) as Childreth
 The Left Handed Gun (1958) as Pete Maxwell
 The Case Against Brooklyn (1958) as Finelli
 Alias Jesse James (1959) as Grigsby (uncredited)
 Pier 5, Havana (1959) as Lopez
 The Purple Gang (1959) as Laurence Orlofsky
 Vice Raid (1959) as Frank Burke
 The Bramble Bush (1960) as Pete Madruga (uncredited)
 Can-Can (1960) as Bailiff
 Go Naked in the World (1961) as Greek Friend of Pete's (uncredited)
 Gold of the Seven Saints (1961) as Gondora Henchman
 Frontier Uprising (1961) as Don Carlos Montalvo
 Atlantis, the Lost Continent (1961) as Megalos (uncredited)
 The Four Horsemen of the Apocalypse (1962) as Miguel
 The Wild Westerners (1962) as Governor John Bullard
 The Three Stooges in Orbit (1962) as Martian Chairman
 Girls! Girls! Girls! (1962) as Arthur Morgan (uncredited)
 California (1963) as Gen. Micheltorena
 The Madmen of Mandoras (1963) as Police Chief Alaniz
 The Ballad of a Gunfighter (1964) as Padre
 Jesse James Meets Frankenstein's Daughter (1966) as Saloon Owner
 Let's Kill Uncle (1966) as Steward
 The Spirit Is Willing (1967) as Felicity's Father

Selected television appearances
 The Lone Ranger (1950-1954, TV Series) - Juan Pedro Cardoza / Juan Branco
 Zorro (1957-1961) - Teo Gonzales - Innkeeper / Teo Gonzales / Señor Pacheco - Innkeeper
 Sea Hunt (1961, TV Series) - Tio Ramon Delgado
 The Andy Griffith Show (1963, TV Series) - Big Jack Anderson
 Gunsmoke (1965, TV Series) - Barman Daller 
 Burke's Law (1965, TV Series) - Dr. Gonzales / Padre Emiliano
 Daniel Boone (1965, TV Series) - Menewa
 Get Smart (1965, TV Series) - Doorman
 I Spy (1966, TV Series) - Del Gado
 The Addams Family'' (1966, TV Series) - Captain Grimby

References

External links

 

American people of Portuguese descent
1905 births
1966 deaths
Deaths from cancer in California
Burials at Forest Lawn Memorial Park (Hollywood Hills)
Male actors from Fresno, California
20th-century American male actors
University of California, Berkeley alumni